Hans Christian Rylander (born 1939, dead 2021) was a Danish painter, educated at the Royal Danish Academy of Fine Arts from 1965 to 1969. He uses an expressive and surreal style, in the 70's and 80's with a critical edge towards society. Rylander has exhibited his works at the Randers Museum of Art, at Storstrøms Kunstmuseum, and at Vejle Museum of Art. A major commission was the decoration in Christian IV's Supply Depot at Slotsholmen in Copenhagen. Rylander received the Eckersberg Medal in 1984.

References 

1939 births
Living people
Artists from Copenhagen
20th-century Danish painters
21st-century Danish painters
Recipients of the Eckersberg Medal